Unsteady may refer to:
Unsteady flow, a condition of fluid mechanics that changes with time
"Unsteady" (song), X Ambassadors 2015 song

See also 
 Steady (disambiguation)
 Unstable (disambiguation)